is a Japanese footballer currently playing as a forward. He will join German club Borussia Mönchengladbach II from the 2023 season, after his final match for Kamimura Gakuen at the 2022 All Japan High School Soccer Tournament. His high school have qualified to the competition after beating Kagoshima Jitsugyo by 2–1 at the final, with Fukuda scoring the opener for Kamimura Gakuen.

Club career
Fukuda was born in Kanoya City, Kagoshima Prefecture, and started his footballing career with Takayama FC. He enrolled at the Kamimura Gakuen High School, and continued to play football for the school team. He was noted for his performances at the 2021 All Japan High School Soccer Tournament, where he was named as one of the best forwards. He scored one goal and got one assist in a 3–2 loss as Kamimura Gakuen were knocked out by Teikyo Nagaoka High School in the second round.

A noted goal-scorer, Fukuda regularly finished as one of the top scorers in each of the tournaments he played in. Following these good performances for the Kamimura Gakuen High School football team, Fukuda was included in The Guardian's "Next Generation" list for 2021.

In September 2021, Fukuda trained with J1 League side Kashima Antlers.

On 27 October 2022, Fukuda was announced by Borussia Mönchengladbach as a new signing for their youth team, despite never playing for a professional club in Japan, signing for the club as a Kamimura Gakuen High School graduate. He will join the German club in January 2023, after the winter vacation period in Japan. Speaking about Fukuda, Mönchengladbach's academy director Mirko Sandmöller stated: "We are pleased that Shio Fukuda has chosen us, even though he had numerous offers from the J1 League. He is a technically adept, agile and developable striker with great potential".

Career statistics

Youth

Professional

International career
Fukuda has represented Japan on all youth categories up to under-19 level, selected multiple times for the national team while at Kamimura Gakuen's Middle and High School.

References

2004 births
Living people
Association football people from Kagoshima Prefecture
Japanese footballers
Japan youth international footballers
Association football forwards